The 2006 African Women's Championship qualification process was organized by the Confederation of African Football (CAF) to decide the participating teams of the 2006 African Women's Championship. Gabon qualified automatically as hosts, while the remaining seven spots were determined by the qualifying rounds, which took place from February to August 2006. Later, Gabon withdrew from hosting the competition due to organisational reasons. The CAF awarded the hosting of the competition to Nigeria in May 2006.

Teams
A record 34 national teams participated in the qualifying process.

Teams who withdrew before playing a match are in italics.

Format
Qualification ties were played on a home-and-away two-legged basis. If the aggregate score was tied after the second leg, the away goals rule would be applied, and if still level, the penalty shoot-out would be used to determine the winner (no extra time would be played).

The seven winners of the final round qualified for the final tournament.

Schedule
The schedule of the qualifying rounds was as follows.

Preliminary round
The results of this round do not appear in the Rec.Sport.Soccer Statistics Foundation (RSSSF) or the official FIFA website.

|}
1 Botswana, Lesotho and Swaziland withdrew.
2 Namibia withdrew after the first leg.
3 Central African Republic were disqualified after the first leg.

Libya won by default and advanced to the first round.

Benin won 1–0 on aggregate and advanced to the first round.

Mozambique won by default and advanced to the first round.

Djibouti won by default and advanced to the first round.

Togo won 9–0 on aggregate and advanced to the first round.

Zambia won by default and advanced to the first round.

Senegal won by default and advanced to the first round.

First round

|}
1 Eritrea, Libya and Uganda withdrew. Ethiopia and Zimbabwe also withdrew (they had originally received byes along with South Africa and Algeria).
2 Only one leg was played between Kenya and Djibouti.

Algeria won by default and advanced to the second round.

Egypt won by default and advanced to the second round.

Mali won 6–1 on aggregate and advanced to the second round.

2–2 on aggregate. Benin won the penalty shoot-out 4–3 and advanced to the second round.

Equatorial Guinea won 5–4 on aggregate and advanced to the second round.

South Africa won 12–3 on aggregate and advanced to the second round.

Tanzania won by default and advanced to the second round.

Congo won 12–1 on aggregate and advanced to the second round.

Only one leg was played. Kenya won 7–0 and advanced to the second round.

DR Congo won 6–2 on aggregate and advanced to the second round.

Senegal won 12–1 on aggregate and advanced to the second round.

Second round

|}
1 The tie was scratched after CAF awarded the hosting rights to Nigeria; Equatorial Guinea also qualified.
2 Congo were disqualified after they failed to appear for the first leg.

Algeria won 4–0 on aggregate and qualified for the final tournament.

Mali won 4–1 on aggregate and qualified for the final tournament.

The tie was scratched after Nigeria were awarded the hosting rights: Equatorial Guinea also qualified for the final tournament.

South Africa won 7–0 on aggregate and qualified for the final tournament.

Congo disqualified; Ghana qualified for the final tournament.

Cameroon won 9–0 on aggregate and qualified for the final tournament.

DR Congo won 3–2 on aggregate and qualified for the final tournament.

Qualified teams

The following teams qualified for the final tournament.

1 Bold indicates champions for that year. Italic indicates hosts for that year.

References

CAF
Women
2006